The Xuandu Temple is a Taoist temple located on the hillside of Mount Heng, in Hengshan County, Hunan, China. It is the site of Hunan Taoist Association.

History
The Xuandu Temple was first established in the Tongzhi period (1862-1874) of Qing dynasty (1644–1911) by Taoist priest Tan Jiaoqing.  It formerly known as a Buddhist temple named Xiyun'an, which was built in the Southern Qi dynasty (479–502).

On November 3, 1985, the Hunan Taoist Association was set up here.

Architecture
The temple consists of more than 5 buildings, including shanmen, HalI of the God of Wealth, Hall of Medicine King, Main Hall, and Sanqing Hall (Hall of Three Pure Ones).

Main Hall
The Main Hall is the second hall in the temple for the worship of the Jade Emperor.

Sanqing Hall
The Sanqing Hall or Hall of Three Pure Ones is the third hall in the temple. In the middle is Yuanshi Tianzun, statues of Daode Tianzun and Lingbao Tianzun stand on the left and right sides.

References

External links

Taoist temples in Hunan
Hengshan County
Tourist attractions in Hengyang